Yabuco Isabela FC is an association football team that plays in Yabucoa.  They currently play in the Puerto Rico Soccer League.

This team is from Yabucoa, Puerto Rico.

Current squad
April 10, 2016

Club hierarchy

General Manager:

Vice President :

Club treasure  :

Achievements

References

External links

Liga Nacional de Fútbol de Puerto Rico teams
Sports in Mayagüez, Puerto Rico
Football clubs in Puerto Rico
Puerto Rico Soccer League teams
2016 establishments in Puerto Rico
Association football clubs established in 2016